Sabally is a surname. Notable people with the surname include:
Hawa Sisay-Sabally, Gambian lawyer and Attorney General 
Momodou Sabally, Gambian Secretary General and head of the Civil Service
Nyara Sabally (born 2000), German basketball player
Satou Sabally (born 1998), German basketball player